Royal Calcutta Golf Club (RCGC) in Kolkata, India was  established in 1829 and is the oldest golf club in India and the first outside Great Britain.

RCGC has an 18-hole golf course with the following detail:  
Yardage: 7195/6871
Par: 72
Rating: 73.6/72.1
Mostly flat terrain, with many natural water hazards with water lilies and largish greens.

The Royal Calcutta Golf Club is the oldest golf club outside the United Kingdom. The oldest club outside Scotland is the Royal Blackheath Golf Club in London, established in 1766.

King George V and Queen Mary conferred the title "Royal" to the Club to commemorate their visit to Calcutta in 1911. Apart from golf, it offers tennis courts and a swimming pool. The Club also maintains a Lawn Bowls Pavilion in the Kolkata Maidan.

The golf course is a green oasis in the city, and is home to foxes, snakes and mongoose as well as many birds.

Shiv Chawrasia is a member, his father was a greenkeeper and he started out as a caddie, but he currently plays on the European Tour.

Scorecard

See also
 List of golf clubs granted Royal status
 List of India's gentlemen's clubs

References

External links
 

Sport in Kolkata
Golf clubs and courses in India
Sports clubs in Kolkata
Sports clubs established in the 1820s
1829 establishments in India
Royal golf clubs